The 1999-2000 Northern Arizona Lumberjacks men's basketball team represented Northern Arizona University in the 1999-2000 NCAA Division I men's basketball season. The Lumberjacks were led by head coach Mike Adras, and played their home games at the Walkup Skydome as members of the Big Sky Conference. After finishing third during the conference regular season, Northern Arizona won the Big Sky tournament to receive an automatic bid to the NCAA tournament. As No. 15 seed in the West region, the Lumberjacks lost to No. 2 seed St. John's in the opening round, 61–56.

Roster 

Source

Schedule and results

|-
!colspan=12 style=| Non-conference regular season

|-
!colspan=12 style=| Big Sky regular season

|-
!colspan=12 style=| Big Sky tournament

|-
!colspan=12 style=| NCAA tournament

|-

Source

References

Northern Arizona Lumberjacks men's basketball seasons
Northern Arizona Lumberjacks
Northern Arizona
Northern Arizona Lumberjacks men's basketball
Northern Arizona Lumberjacks men's basketball